Phalonidia tarijana is a species of moth of the family Tortricidae. It is found in Bolivia.

The wingspan is about 23 mm. The ground colour of the forewings is yellowish, mixed with brown and with yellow-brown suffusions and spots. The markings are also yellowish brown, sprinkled with brown. The hindwings are cream, in the apical third mixed with orange.

Etymology
The species name refers to Tarija Department in Bolivia.

References

Moths described in 2013
Phalonidia